Cotunnite is the natural mineral form of lead(II) chloride (PbCl2). Unlike the pure compound, which is white,  cotunnite can be white, yellow, or green. The density of mineral samples spans range 5.3–5.8 g/cm3. The hardness on the Mohs scale is 1.5–2. The crystal structure is orthorhombic dipyramidal and the point group is 2/m 2/m 2/m. Each Pb has a coordination number of 9. Cotunnite occurs near volcanoes: Vesuvius, Italy; Tarapacá, Chile; and Tolbachik, Russia.

It was first described in 1825 from an occurrence on Mount Vesuvius, Naples Province, Campania, Italy. It was named for Domenico Cotugno (Cotunnius) (1736–1822), Italian physician and Professor of Anatomy.

It was first recognized in volcanic fumarole deposits. It occurs as a secondary alteration product in lead ore deposits. It has also been reported as an alteration of archaeological objects that contain lead.

It occurs in association with galena, cerussite, anglesite and matlockite in the Caracoles, Chile. At the Tolbachik volcano on the Kamchatka Peninsula, Russia it occurs with the rare to uncommon minerals tenorite, ponomarevite, sofiite, burnsite, ilinskite, georgbokite, chloromenite, halite, sylvite and native gold.

References

Halide minerals
Lead minerals
Orthorhombic minerals
Minerals in space group 62